Sir Purshottamdas Thakurdas (1879–1961), was a Gujarati cotton trader, mill owner, businessman and industrialist from Mumbai, India. He was one of the signatory of Bombay Plan, which was set of proposals for the post-independence economy of India. He along with GD Birla established Federation of Indian Chambers of Commerce & Industry in 1927 on the advice of Mahatma Gandhi. He was a member of the Hilton Young Commission.He was a member of the Acworth Committee.  He headed the Foodgrain Policy Committee of 1947.

References 

Gujarati people
Businesspeople from Mumbai
Gujaratis from Mumbai
Indian Knights Bachelor
Companions of the Order of the Indian Empire
Members of the Order of the British Empire
Indian Knights Commander of the Order of the British Empire
Indian businesspeople in textiles
Members of the Bombay Legislative Council
Members of the Bombay State Legislative Assembly
Recipients of the Kaisar-i-Hind Medal
Members of the Council of State (India)
Founders of Indian schools and colleges
Indian philanthropists
Indian bankers